Melese asana is a moth of the family Erebidae. It was described by Herbert Druce in 1884. It is found in Mexico, Panama, Honduras, Colombia and the Amazon region.

References

 

Melese
Moths described in 1884
Arctiinae of South America